I've Got My Own Hell to Raise is an album by Bettye LaVette. It was released on September 27, 2005, on ANTI-. The album comprises covers of songs written by other female artists including Aimee Mann, Joan Armatrading, Sinéad O'Connor, Rosanne Cash, Dolly Parton and Fiona Apple, whose song "Sleep to Dream" (1997) contains the album's title within its lyrics.  I've Got My Own Hell to Raise was chosen as one of Amazon.com's Top 100 Editor's Picks of 2005.

Track listing
 "I Do Not Want What I Haven't Got" (Sinéad O'Connor) – 2:11
 "Joy" (Lucinda Williams) – 3:55
  "Down To Zero" (Joan Armatrading) – 3:10
 "The High Road" (Sharon Robinson) – 4:29
 "On the Surface" (Rosanne Cash) – 3:26
 "Just Say So" (Cathy Majeski, John Scott Sherrill) – 4:29
 "Little Sparrow" (Dolly Parton) – 4:41
 "How Am I Different" (Aimee Mann, Jon Brion) – 4:28
 "Only Time Will Tell" (Toni Brown) – 4:33
 "Sleep to Dream" by (Fiona Apple) – 3:46

Personnel
Musicians
Bettye LaVette - vocals
Chris Bruce - acoustic and electric guitar
Doyle Bramhall II - electric guitar
Lisa Coleman - piano, organ, Wurlitzer electric piano
Paul Bryan - electric bass
Earl Harvin - drums
David Piltch - upright bass
Niki Harris - backing vocals
 Valerie Watson - backing vocals

Production
Joe Henry - producer
Andy Kaulkin - executive producer
S. Husky Höskulds - engineer, mixing
Gavin Lurssen - mastering

References

2005 albums
Bettye LaVette albums
Albums produced by Joe Henry
Anti- (record label) albums